The 9th Electronic Warfare Battalion "Rombo" is an inactive electronic warfare unit of the Italian Army last based in Anzio in Latium. The battalion was formed in 1959 and reported to the Army's General Staff. In 1975 the battalion was named for the Timmelsjoch Pass and received its own flag. The battalion was the army's strategic electronic warfare unit during the Cold War. The battalion was disbanded in 1998 and its tasks and personnel were transferred to the army's 33rd Electronic Warfare Battalion "Falzarego" and the Italian Armed Forces' Information and Security Department.

History 
On 1 April 1959 the IX Signal Battalion was formed in Rome by expanding the Special Signal I-RG Company with personnel from the disbanded XI Signal Battalion. The Special Signal I-RG Company had been formed on 15 April 1955 and was tasked with interception and radio direction finding. The XI Signal Battalion had been formed on 1 March 1957 by the army's Signal School in Rome by expanding the Signal Experimentation Company.

On 1 October 1961 the battalion moved from Rome to Anzio. On 1 December 1963 the battalion was assigned to the newly formed Electronic Defense Center. On 1 September 1970 the battalion was renamed IX Electronic Warfare Battalion.

During the 1975 army reform the army disbanded the regimental level and battalions were granted for the first time their own flags. During the reform signal battalions were renamed for mountain passes. On 1 September 1976 the IX Electronic Warfare Battalion was renamed 9th Electronic Warfare Battalion "Rombo". On the same day the 8th Signals Intelligence Battalion "Tonale" was formed by the Electronic Defense Center.

The 9th Electronic Warfare Battalion "Rombo" consisted of a command, a command and services platoon, communications company, and a communications-denial battery. On 12 November 1976 the battalion was granted a flag by decree 846 of the President of the Italian Republic Giovanni Leone. The flags of the Rombo, 8th Signals Intelligence Battalion "Tonale", and Electronic Defense Center arrived at the units on 22 March 1977.

On 1 January 1998 the 9th Electronic Warfare Battalion "Rombo" was disbanded and its personnel transferred either to the 33rd Electronic Warfare Battalion "Falzarego" or the Information and Security Department of the Italian Armed Forces' General Staff, while the battalion's flag was transferred to the Shrine of the Flags in the Vittoriano in Rome.

References

Signal Regiments of Italy